Riasanites is an Upper Jurassic ammonite belonging to the ammonitid.

Distribution 
Poland, USSR and Yemen

References
Notes

Jurassic ammonites